Ivan Čurjurić (born 29 September 1989) is a Croatian professional footballer who plays as an attacking midfielder for Maltese top flight side Valletta.

Club career
After spells in Croatia, Cyprus, Greece and Romania he moved to Bosnia and Herzegovina and joined Bosnian Premier League club Olimpik in 2021.. He moved to Malta in summer 2021 and extended his contract with Valletta for another season in February 2022.

Honours
Enosis Neon Paralimni 
Cypriot Second Division: 2017–18

References

External links
Ivan Čurjurić at Sofascore
Ivan Čurjurić profile at Statistics Football 

1989 births
Living people
Sportspeople from Zadar
Association football midfielders
Croatian footballers
HNK Hajduk Split players
NK Zadar players
NK Zagreb players
Nea Salamis Famagusta FC players
PAS Lamia 1964 players
Ayia Napa FC players
ACS Poli Timișoara players
Enosis Neon Paralimni FC players
FK Željezničar Sarajevo players
HŠK Zrinjski Mostar players
FK Olimpik players
Valletta F.C. players
Croatian Football League players
Cypriot First Division players
Football League (Greece) players
Liga I players
Premier League of Bosnia and Herzegovina players
Maltese Premier League players
Croatian expatriate footballers
Expatriate footballers in Greece
Croatian expatriate sportspeople in Greece
Expatriate footballers in Cyprus
Croatian expatriate sportspeople in Cyprus
Expatriate footballers in Romania
Croatian expatriate sportspeople in Romania
Expatriate footballers in Bosnia and Herzegovina
Croatian expatriate sportspeople in Bosnia and Herzegovina
Expatriate footballers in Malta
Croatian expatriate sportspeople in Malta